Frankenstein, in comics, may refer to:

Frankenstein (DC Comics), from DC Comics' Seven Soldiers
Frankenstein (Dell Comics), the star of a short-lived series by Dell Comics
Frankenstein's Monster (Marvel Comics), from Marvel Comics' The Monster of Frankenstein
Frankenstein, a clone of the Marvel Comics character that appeared in the comic book series Nick Fury's Howling Commandos.
Frankenstein (Prize Comics), a 1940 to 1954 version by writer-artist Dick Briefer
Frankenstein Monster, a Wildstorm character who has appeared in Wetworks

It may also refer to:
I, Frankenstein a series by Darkstorm Comics which inspired a film
Doc Frankenstein, a series written by the Wachowskis
Frankenstein, the central character in Death Race 2020 a comic book sequel to the film Death Race 2000, based on the character played by David Carradine
"Frankenstein Meets Shirley Temple", a story in A1 by Roger Langridge
Frankenstein: Monster Mayhem, a 2005 comic from Dead Dog Comics
Super Frankenstein, a parody produced by Big Bang Comics
"Universal Monsters: Frankenstein", one-shot from Dark Horse Comics
Young Frankenstein (comics), a DC character and member of the Teen Titans
Embalming -The Another Tale of Frankenstein-, a Japanese manga series written and illustrated by Nobuhiro Watsuki.
Frank, a depiction of Frankenstein's Monster in the comic Screamland

It may also refer to the similar-sounding:
Frankenstein Mobster, a 2003 series from Image Comics

Elseworlds titles that retell the story through well-known superheroes:
Batman: Castle of the Bat
The Superman Monster

See also
Frankenstein (disambiguation)
Frankenstein in popular culture#Comics, for a list of appearances and comic book adaptations of the story

References

Comics based on Frankenstein